The 1990–91 Albanian National Championship was the 52nd season of the Albanian National Championship, the top professional league for association football clubs, since its establishment in 1930.

Teams

Stadia and last season

League table

Results

First and second round

Third round

Season statistics

Top scorers

Notes

References

Albania - List of final tables (RSSSF)

Kategoria Superiore seasons
1
Albanian Superliga